Charlesworth is a civil parish in the High Peak district of Derbyshire, England. The parish contains 15 listed buildings that are recorded in the National Heritage List for England.  All the listed buildings are designated at Grade II, the lowest of the three grades, which is applied to "buildings of national importance and special interest".  The parish contains the village of Charlesworth and the surrounding countryside.  Most of the listed buildings are houses and cottages, farmhouses and farm buildings.  The other listed buildings are a bridge, a church, a chapel and its associated walls, and a war memorial.


Buildings

References

Citations

Sources

 

Lists of listed buildings in Derbyshire